Chalti Duniya is a 1940 Bollywood film directed by Gunjal. It stars Rafig Ghaznavi.

References

External links
 

1940 films
1940s Hindi-language films
Indian black-and-white films